The 2003–04 Segunda División season saw 22 teams participate in the second flight Spanish league. The teams that were promoted to La Liga were Levante UD, Getafe CF, and CD Numancia. The teams that were relegated to Segunda División B were CD Leganés, UD Las Palmas, Rayo Vallecano, and Algeciras CF.

Teams 

(*) Relegated from La Liga.

(**) Promoted from Segunda División B.

Teams by Autonomous Community

Final table

Results

Segunda División seasons
2
Spain